The 2013 Youth Parapan American Games (Spanish: Juegos Juveniles Parapanamericanos de 2013) were a multi-sport event held from 14 to 19 October 2013 in Buenos Aires, Argentina. They were the third edition of the Youth Parapan American Games and they were organized by the Ministry of Social Development, the Argentinian Paralympic Committee (COPAR), the ENARD and the International Paralympic Committee.

Venues

All competitive venues were located in Núñez.

Medals table

See also
2015 Summer Transplant Games

References

External links
 

Sports competitions in Buenos Aires
Multi-sport events in Argentina
Youth Parapan American Games
Parapan
Parapan
Para